Li Qi (born 30 October 1983 in Dalian, Liaoning) is a Chinese softball player who competed at the 2004 Summer Olympics.

In the 2004 Olympic softball competition she finished fourth with the Chinese team.

She was to compete for Team China at the 2008 Summer Olympics in Beijing.

References
Profile

1983 births
Living people
Chinese softball players
Olympic softball players of China
Sportspeople from Dalian
Softball players at the 2004 Summer Olympics
Softball players at the 2008 Summer Olympics
Asian Games medalists in softball
Softball players at the 2002 Asian Games
Softball players at the 2006 Asian Games
Softball players at the 2010 Asian Games
Softball players at the 2014 Asian Games
Asian Games silver medalists for China
Asian Games bronze medalists for China
Medalists at the 2002 Asian Games
Medalists at the 2006 Asian Games
Medalists at the 2010 Asian Games
Medalists at the 2014 Asian Games